Ape Escape Academy, also known as Ape Academy in Europe and Piposaru Academia: Dossari! Sarugee Daizenshuu in Japan, is a game for the PlayStation Portable system that consists of a collection of 47 mini-games, many of which borrow from elements of Ape Escape 2. The game was first released in Japan and later in Europe and North America. By utilizing the PSP's Wi-Fi capabilities, up to 4 players can play at a time.

The North American release was on the same day as Ape Escape 3.

A sequel, Ape Escape Academy 2 was released in Japan and Europe, but not in North America.

Gameplay
A monkey working for Specter, the player must work up from junior class to senior class by playing mini games by meeting certain criteria for each class. There are 9 mini games in each class to complete. Failing to meet the criteria rewards the player with an X, while meeting the criteria rewards an O, similar to tic-tac-toe.

Each level has a certain number of lines required to pass the class (one line consists of 3 Os, either horizontally, vertically or diagonal). The game also offers review lessons for players that have almost met the requirements. Usually, these are mini-games that the player has failed previously.

Critical reception

The game received generally mixed reviews, averaging just 55% on GameRankings based on 58 reviews. Many reviewers criticized the difficulty of most of the mini-games, as the controls were not explained fully, often leading to a failure during the first run in these minigames, but generally liked the variations in the available mini-games.

Game Informer gave the game a review score of 8/10 noting how the game focuses on mini games like the Wario Ware series and saying the game does give some quick thrills and giving criticism to the loading times between games diminishes the fast-paced feel in comparison to the Wario Ware games concluding: "Still, this unambiguous title manages to (mostly) hit its target".

It is believed that because of this game's lackluster reception, the future of the Ape Escape series in the North America is uncertain, as successive titles in the series (such as Ape Escape Racer and Ape Escape Million Monkeys) have yet to receive a North American release. However, Ape Quest was released for download for the PSP on the PlayStation Store in Japan & the US.

See also
 Ape Escape
 Ape Academy 2

References

External links
 

2004 video games
Ape Escape games
Multiplayer and single-player video games
Party video games
PlayStation Portable games
PlayStation Portable-only games
Video games developed in Japan
School-themed video games
Sony Interactive Entertainment games